The Speedmaster is a Triumph cruiser motorcycle designed and built in Hinckley, Leicestershire.

Development
The Triumph Speedmaster was launched in 2003 as a 'factory custom' cruiser based on the Bonneville America. The original model had the  air-cooled DOHC twin engine and had an extended  wheelbase with the crankshaft at 270°. Main differences from the Bonneville America included black finish to the engine, shortened gearing, a flat handlebar on risers, one piece saddle and cast alloy wheels with twin front discs, in place of the single disc of the America. The 'Speedmaster' name was last used in 1965 for the Bonneville T120R by American importers but not by the Triumph factory.

In 2007, a multipoint sequential fuel injection model was launched, with new design alloy wheels, a restyled chain cover, pillion footrest hanger and upper fork shrouds, as well as slash cut silencers and four new paint schemes.

A new Speedmaster marque was reintroduced in 2018 as the Bonneville Speedmaster, from Triumph's 'Modern Classics' line. Featuring the all new 2017 Bonneville's 1200cc High Torque liquid-cooled engine, the 2018 Speedmaster re-purposed the Triumph Bobber Black's faux-hardtail chassis into a light-duty tourer by adding a larger fuel tank (3.17 gal. vs. the Bobber's 2.4 gal.), larger rider's seat and pillion seat with passenger foot pegs, 'beach bar' handlebars with more pullback, forward controls, chrome exhausts and accents, and a rear fender with mounting points for optional saddlebags.

Just like the Bobber Black, the 2018 Speedmaster has a ride-by-wire throttle allowing for selectable 'Rain' and 'Road' modes that modulate throttle response, and one-touch cruise-control; ABS and traction control; LED lighting with daytime running light; twin front disc brakes with Brembo calipers; upgraded KYB front forks; and larger tires.

See also
List of Triumph motorcycles

References

External links

Speedmaster
Motorcycles powered by straight-twin engines